Verdura Plantation was a large cotton plantation of  in eastern Leon County, Florida, United States established by Benjamin Chaires.

History 
Benjamin Chaires Sr. was an early arrival in Leon County and one of the wealthiest land owners in Leon County. His brothers Green H. Chaires and Thomas Peter Chaires also established plantations in Leon County, Evergreen Hills Plantation and Woodlawn Plantation, respectively.

Chaires bought  10 miles east of Tallahassee in 1832. That land became the nucleus of the Verdura plantation. That year Chaires built a plantation house on his new plantation. The house was built of bricks in Greek Revival style. It had three floors and 15 rooms, each with a fireplace. The downstairs rooms could be opened up to create an 80-foot long ballroom. Verandas supported by ten (five on each side) Tuscan order columns were on the East and West sides, rather than across the front. It was built of bricks made by hand by slaves on the plantation. The house stood on a hill partially surrounded by a stream. On a clear day the Gulf of Mexico was visible from the attic. The plantation house burned in 1885.

Chaires added to the plantation throughout the 1830s, including in 1836, when he added a plantation of 800 acres and 57 slaves to his holdings. Chaires died in 1838. His son Joseph Chaires was managing the plantation that year. His estate continued to grow after his death. In 1842, the estate (which had not yet been divided among the heirs) foreclosed on property, including land and slaves, valued at $35,570.

Chaires left the plantation house and 500 acres surrounding it to his wife, Sarah, as well as 10% of his personal estate. Chaires had ten children, five of whom were minors. Chaires appointed his brother Green and his son Joseph as executors.

Benjamin Chaires was the master of Verdura when the Great Storm of 1873 killed seven mules there.

Each child's share of the Verdura plantation was still among the largest plantations in Leon County. While some planters were heavily in debt at their deaths, Chaires was not, and his heirs continued to maintain large holdings, and were not involved in lawsuits with banks over debts. The plantation suffered after the Civil War from the loss of slave labor and a depression in the cotton market. After the main house burned in 1885, the plantation was abandoned. It was sold by the Chaires family in 1948.

See also 

 Plantations of Leon County, Florida
National Register of Historic Places listings in Leon County, Florida

Notes

References

Plantations in Leon County, Florida
Cotton plantations in Florida
Burned houses in the United States